Clepsis fraterna is a species of moth of the family Tortricidae. It is found in Ecuador in the provinces of Loja and Morona-Santiago.

References

Moths described in 2004
Clepsis